
 (from Latin: "It Befits the Roman Pontiff"; 1521) is the papal bull that excommunicated the German theologian Martin Luther; its title comes from the first three Latin words of its text. It was issued on 3 January 1521 by Pope Leo X to effect the excommunication threatened in his earlier papal bull,  (1520), for Luther had failed to recant.

There are at least two other important papal bulls with the title : one dated 23 February 1596, issued by Pope Clement VIII, and one dated 12 March 1622, issued by Pope Gregory XV.

Toward the end of the 20th century, Lutherans in dialogue with the Catholic Church requested the lifting of this excommunication, but the Roman Curia responded that its practice is to lift excommunications only on those still living. Roland Bainton, in "Here I Stand after a Quarter of a Century", his preface for the 1978 edition of his Luther biography, concluded: "I am happy that the Church of Rome has allowed some talk of removing the excommunication of Luther. This might well be done. He was never a heretic. He might better be called, as one has phrased it, 'a reluctant rebel.'"

In 2008, a Vatican spokesman, the Jesuit Federico Lombardi, said "Rumors that the Vatican is set to rehabilitate Martin Luther, the 16th-century leader of the Protestant Reformation, are groundless."

References

Citations

Works cited

External links 
 Text of Decet Romanum Pontificem (Microsoft Word format)

1521 in Christianity
1521 documents
16th-century papal bulls
Documents of Pope Leo X
Martin Luther